The Homeland Security Act (HSA) of 2002, was introduced in the aftermath of the September 11 attacks and subsequent mailings of anthrax spores. The HSA was cosponsored by 118 members of Congress. The act passed the U.S. Senate by a vote of 90–9, with one Senator not voting. It was signed into law by President George W. Bush in November 2002.

HSA created the United States Department of Homeland Security and the new cabinet-level position of Secretary of Homeland Security. It is the largest federal government reorganization since the Department of Defense was created via the National Security Act of 1947 (as amended in 1949).   It also includes many of the organizations under which the powers of the USA PATRIOT Act are exercised.

Background

The new department assumed a large number of services, offices and other organizations previously conducted in other departments, such as the Customs Service, Coast Guard, and U.S. Secret Service.  It superseded, but did not replace, the Office of Homeland Security, which retained an advisory role.  The Homeland Security Appropriations Act of 2004 provided the new department its first funding. A major reason for the implementation of HSA is to ensure that the border function remains strong within the new Department.

The Act is similar to the Intelligence Reform and Terrorism Prevention Act (IRTPA) in reorganizing and centralizing Federal security functions to meet post–Cold War threats and challenges. Like IRTPA, there are some inherent contradictions in the bill not solved by reorganization.  These reflect compromises with other committees needed to secure passage, but the result is at times inconsistent or conflicting authorities.  For example, the Act identifies the Department of Homeland Security's (DHS) first responsibility as preventing terrorist attacks in the United States; but, the law's language makes clear that investigation and prosecution of terrorism remains with the Federal Bureau of Investigation and assigns DHS only an analytical and advisory role in intelligence activities.  Similarly, with Critical Infrastructure Protection (CIP), which relates to the preparedness and response to serious incidents, the Act gave DHS broad responsibility to minimize damage but only limited authority to share information and to coordinate the development of private sector best practices.

Establishments
The Homeland Security Act of 2002 is the foundation for many other establishments, including:
 the Department of Homeland Security, which is headed by the Secretary of Homeland Security
 an established Directorate for Information Analysis and Infrastructure Protection within the Department of Homeland Security, which is headed by the Under Secretary for Information Analysis and Infrastructure Protection.
 the Critical Infrastructure Information Act of 2002
  the Cyber Security Enhancement Act of 2002

Titles
The Homeland Security Act of 2002 documented under Public Law is divided into 17 titles that establishes the Department of Homeland Security and other purposes. Each title is broken down into several sections, summarized below.

1. Department of Homeland Security
Title I consists of three sections that establish the Department of Homeland Security, which carries out several missions that comply with the United States Code.

2. Information Analysis And Infrastructure Protection
Title II consists of two subtitles, including the Critical Infrastructure Information Act of 2002, and nineteen sections, including the Cyber Security Enhancement Act of 2002. It is headed by the Under Secretary and used to access, receive and analyze law enforcement information, intelligence information, and other information from federal, state, and local government agencies for further use towards the prevention of terrorist acts.

3. Science And Technology In Support of Homeland Security
Title III consists of thirteen sections. It is described as a plan to develop national policy and strategic plans to develop countermeasures for chemical, biological, radiological, nuclear and other emerging terrorist threats. It also establishes, conducts, and administers primary research and development.

4. Directorate Of Border And Transportation Security
Title IV consists of forty-eight sections and regulates what comes in out of United States territory in an effort to prevent terrorists and instruments of terrorism. This is done generally by securing the borders, territorial waters, ports, terminals, waterways, and air, land, and sea transportation systems of the United States, including managing and coordinating governmental activities at ports of entry.

5. Emergency Preparedness and Response
Title V consists of nine sections and it helps to ensure the response time and preparedness of providers for terrorist attacks, major disasters and other emergencies. In addition, it establishes standards, joint exercises and trainings and providing funds to the United States Department of Energy and the Environmental Protection Agency.

6. Treatment of Charitable Trusts For Members Of The Armed Forces Of The United States And Other Governmental Organizations
Title VI consists of one section which, through several requirements, designates the late Central Intelligence Agency officer Johnny Michael Spann as a trust fund for distribution towards surviving spouses, children, or dependent parents, grandparents, or siblings of Government related service members.

7. Management
Title VII consists of six sections which is headed by the Under Secretary to manage the budget, appropriations, expenditures of funds, accounting, and finance, human resources, information technology, and procurement of the Departments.

8. Coordination With Non-Federal Entities; Inspector General; United States Secret Service; Coast Guard; General Provisions
Title VIII consists of fifty-three sections that establishes an Office for State and Local Governments to oversee and coordinate Departmental programs for and relationships with State and local governments.

9. National Homeland Security Council
Title IX consists of six sections which establishes a "Homeland Security Council" within the Executive Office of the President. This Council functions as an advisor to the President.

10. Information Security
Title X consists of seven sections regarding the establishment of several divisions of information security. This title and its subchapter provide tactics and mechanisms for protecting federal information and preserve information security. It also establishes set standards,  responsibilities, authorities and functions, the various definitions in information security, and an annual independent evaluation.

11. Department of Justice Divisions
Title XI consists of sixteen sections which detail the powers and duties of the Secretary, the Under Secretary, and the Attorney General.

12. Airline War Risk Insurance Legislation
Title XII consists of four sections which detail air carrier liability for third-party claims arising out of acts of terrorism, extension of insurance policies, correction of reference, and reports.

13. Federal Workforce Improvement
Title XIII consists of thirteen sections which in several chapters details and establishes Chief Human Capital Officers and its council.

14. Arming Pilots Against Terrorism
Title XIV consists of seven sections which contains the establishment of  a program to deputize volunteer pilots of air carriers providing passenger air transportation or intrastate passenger air transportation as Federal law enforcement officers to defend the flight decks of aircraft of such air carriers against acts of criminal violence or air piracy.

15. Transition
Title XV consists of ten sections establishing the 12-month period beginning on the effective date of this Act. It consists of the definitions, reorganization plan, plan elements, and modification of plans.

16. Corrections To Existing Law Relating To Airline Transportation Security
Title XVI consists of three sections that establish retention of security sensitive information authority at the Department of Transportation, increase civil penalties, and allow United States citizens and United States nationals as screeners.

17. Conforming And Technical Amendments
Title XVII consists of seven sections that amend or alter several acts and amendments of the United States such as the Inspector General Act of 1978 and Title 5 of the United States Code

Department of Homeland Security

The United States Department of Homeland Security (DHS), formed November 25, 2002 through the Homeland Security Act, is a Cabinet department composed of several different divisions that work to protect the United States from domestic and foreign terrorism. It was created as a response to the September 11 attacks in 2001. The Department of Homeland Security manages the Emergency Preparedness and Response Directorate. The directorate helps fulfill the Department's overarching goal: to keep America safe from terrorist attacks. The Department also works to enhance preparedness and response efforts and to integrate these efforts with prevention work. With the Homeland Security Act there are several provisions that identify the specific duties for the EP&R Directorate.

Provisions

The Homeland Security Act contains several provisions that identify specific duties for the EP&R Directorate. Title V and Title II outline the way the department ensures  that the use of intelligence and its own threat analysis of terrorist capabilities are intended to distribute funds to those areas where the terrorist threat is greatest, and that states provide the Federal Government with their Emergency Response Plans so that the department can coordinate priorities regionally and nationally.

Establishments under the Homeland Security Department

 Ready.gov which was conceived in March 2002 and launched in February 2003
 National Incident Management System which was established in March 2004
 National Response Plan (NRP) which was created in December 2004
 National Cyber Security Division (NCSD)
 E-Verify

Amendments

Proposed
Department of Homeland Security Interoperable Communications Act (H.R. 4289; 113th Congress) - a bill that would amend the Homeland Security Act of 2002 to make the Under Secretary for Management of the Department of Homeland Security (DHS) responsible for policies and directives to achieve and maintain interoperable communications among DHS components. The bill was written in reaction to a 2012 report by the DHS Inspector General that indicated DHS "lacks an effective governance structure to ensure interoperable communications across divisions.
National Cybersecurity and Critical Infrastructure Protection Act of 2013 (H.R. 3696; 113th Congress) – a bill that would amend the Homeland Security Act of 2002 to require the Secretary of the Department of Homeland Security (DHS) to conduct cybersecurity activities on behalf of the federal government and would codify the role of DHS in preventing and responding to cybersecurity incidents involving the Information Technology (IT) systems of federal civilian agencies and critical infrastructure in the United States. The bill passed in the United States House of Representatives on July 28, 2014.

Legislative information
Senate: 
House:  HR. Rept. 107-609
Law: ,

See also
 Federal Emergency Management Agency, established by the Homeland Security Department
 History of homeland security in the United States
 Homeland Security Advisory System
 Homeland Security Appropriations Act
 Homeland Security Grant Program
 Intelligence Reform and Terrorism Prevention Act
 September 11 attacks
 Terrorism in the United States
 United States Department of Homeland Security
 Support Anti-Terrorism by Fostering Effective Technologies Act (Title VII, Subtitle G of the HSA)

References

External links
 As codified in 6 U.S.C. chapter 1 of the United States Code from the LII
 As codified in 6 U.S.C. chapter 1 of the United States Code from the US House of Representatives
 Homeland Security Act of 2002 (PDF/details) as amended in the GPO Statute Compilations collection
 Homeland Security Act of 2002 as enacted in the US Statutes at Large

United States Department of Homeland Security
Acts of the 107th United States Congress